The eighth season of the American comedy television series It's Always Sunny in Philadelphia premiered on FX on October 11, 2012. The season consists of 10 episodes, and concluded airing on December 20, 2012.

Cast

Main cast
 Charlie Day as Charlie Kelly
 Glenn Howerton as Dennis Reynolds
 Rob McElhenney as Mac 
 Kaitlin Olson as Dee Reynolds
 Danny DeVito as Frank Reynolds

Recurring cast
 Mary Elizabeth Ellis as The Waitress
 David Hornsby as Cricket
 Artemis Pebdani as Artemis
 Lance Barber as Bill Ponderosa
 Catherine Reitman as Maureen Ponderosa
 Jimmi Simpson as Liam McPoyle
 Nate Mooney as Ryan McPoyle
 Lynne Marie Stewart as Bonnie
 Sandy Martin as Mrs. Mac
 Brian Unger as The Lawyer

Guest stars
 Richard Ruccolo as Corporate Rep
 Guillermo del Toro as Pappy McPoyle
 Sianoa Smit-McPhee as Bridesmaid
 Alexandra Daddario as Ruby Taft
 Josh Casaubon as Trevor Taft
  Steve Tom as Jameson Taft
 Kerri Kenney as Therapist
 Sean "Diddy" Combs as Dr. Jinx
 Joel Murray as Andrew Kane

Episodes

Reception
The eighth season received positive reviews. On Rotten Tomatoes, it has an approval rating of 100% with an average score of 7.4 out of 10 based on 14 reviews. The website's critical consensus reads, "Always Sunnys eighth season, holding no greater ambition than to just let the Gang humiliate themselves through a succession of depraved hijinks, excels at its goal with gut-busting results."

Home media

References

External links 

 
 

2012 American television seasons
It's Always Sunny in Philadelphia